David Downing was an American stage, film, and television actor. He was one of the original members of the Negro Ensemble Company in New York City.

Downing, a native of Harlem, New York City, attended the High School of Performing Arts. As a child actor, he made his professional debut on Broadway in The Green Pastures. He served a tour of duty with the U.S. Armed Forces in Okinawa.

As part of the Negro Ensemble Company in the 1960s and 70s, Downing appeared in productions including the Obie Award-winning musical The Great MacDaddy, and the successful play Ceremonies in Dark Old Men. Downing later appeared in the Pulitzer Prize-nominated play, Miss Evers' Boys.

Downing appeared in films, including Gordon's War, and numerous television shows, including The Jeffersons, Baretta, Backstairs at the White House, and Fresh Prince of Bel-Air.

Downing died in Los Angeles on November 1, 2017 at the age of 74.

Filmography (selected)

Film

Television

References

External links
 
 

American male film actors
American male stage actors
American male television actors
African-American male actors
Male actors from New York City
2017 deaths
1943 births
20th-century African-American people
21st-century African-American people